Taeniaptera trivittata is a species of stilt-legged flies in the family Micropezidae.

References

Further reading

 Arnett, Ross H. (2000). American Insects: A Handbook of the Insects of America North of Mexico. CRC Press.

External links

 Diptera.info
 NCBI Taxonomy Browser, Taeniaptera trivittata

Micropezidae
Insects described in 1835